Gschaid bei Birkfeld is a former municipality in the district of Weiz in the Austrian state of Styria. Since the 2015 Styria municipal structural reform, it is part of the municipality Birkfeld.

References

Cities and towns in Weiz District